The 1991–92 Seton Hall Pirates men's basketball team represented Seton Hall University during the 1991–92 NCAA men's college basketball season. The Pirates were led by tenth year head coach P.J. Carlesimo.

Roster

Schedule and results

|-
!colspan=12 style=| Regular season

|-
!colspan=12 style=| Big East Tournament

|-
!colspan=12 style=| NCAA Tournament

Sources

Rankings

References

Seton Hall Pirates men's basketball seasons
Seton Hall
Seton Hall
Seton Hall
Seton Hall